Mari Gilbert (June 22, 1964 – July 23, 2016) was an American activist and murder victim advocate.

Biography
Gilbert was an advocate for her daughter, Shannan, a 24-year-old woman from New Jersey who disappeared in May 2010. The investigation of Shannan's disappearance led to the discovery of the remains of 10 homicide victims scattered along Ocean Parkway in New York. Investigators believed that Shannan died of an accidental drowning that was unrelated to the crimes of the Long Island serial killer, but Gilbert challenged the finding and fought to have the case reopened as a murder investigation. An independent autopsy sought by Gilbert's family found that Shannan may have been strangled to death. Gilbert and her other daughters, Sarra and Sherre, frequently appeared on television shows discussing the case.

Death
Gilbert was stabbed to death by her 27-year-old daughter Sarra in Sarra's apartment building on Warren Street in Ellenville, New York, on July 23, 2016. Her daughter suffered from schizophrenia, with one report claiming that she "had voices in her head telling her to carry out the crime." Sarra was charged with second-degree murder and fourth-degree possession of a weapon, convicted of murder, and sentenced to 25 years in jail in August 2017. She is imprisoned in the Bedford Hills Correctional Facility for Women.

In popular culture 

 In the 2020 Netflix original film Lost Girls, Gilbert is portrayed by Amy Ryan.
 In the 2021 Lifetime television film The Long Island Serial Killer: A Mother's Hunt for Justice, Gilbert is portrayed by Kim Delaney.

References

External links

American activists
American television personalities
American women television personalities
1964 births
2016 deaths
American murder victims
Matricides
People murdered in New York (state)
Violence against women in the United States
 deaths by stabbing in New York (state)
 2016 murders in the United States
Female murder victims